Élodie Ravera-Scaramozzino (born 19 September 1995) is a French rower. She competed in the women's double sculls event at the 2016 Summer Olympics. Ravera-Scaramozzino rowed collegiately for the Ohio State Buckeyes.

References

External links
 

1995 births
Living people
French female rowers
Olympic rowers of France
Rowers at the 2016 Summer Olympics
Rowers at the 2020 Summer Olympics
Place of birth missing (living people)
Ohio State Buckeyes rowers
European Rowing Championships medalists
21st-century French women
20th-century French women